Saint Nestor may refer to:

Nestor of Magydos (died 250)
Nestor of Thessaloniki (died c. 300)
Nestor the Chronicler (c.1056–c.1114)